Fidelis may refer to:

People
 See Fidelis (name)

Places
 Fidelis, Florida, an unincorporated community and census-designated place in Santa Rosa County, Florida, United States.
 São Fidélis, a municipality in Rio de Janeiro, Brazil
 Baltazar Fidélis (CPTM), São Paulo metro station

Organisations
 Fidelis Books, division of LifeWay Christian Resources
 Fidelis Care, U.S. nonprofit insurer 
 Fidelis Cybersecurity, acquired by General Dynamics
 Fidelis Education, technology company
 Fidelis, 501(c)4 organization owning CatholicVote.org
 Fidelis Furnishing Fabrics, litigant in Panorama Developments (Guildford) Ltd v Fidelis Furnishing Fabrics Ltd, 1971 UK company law case concerning the enforceability of obligations against a company.
 Fidelis Institute of Economic Ethics, within the Pontifical Athenaeum Regina Apostolorum. 

Other
 Fidelis Andria, an Italian football club based in Andria, Apulia
 Sprint Fidelis, cardiac monitor made by Medtronic

See also
  
 Semper fidelis (disambiguation)
 "Adeste Fidelis", Latin Christmas carol
 "Pia Fidelis", motto of various ancient Roman legions
 Fidelity
 Fidel (given name)